Natore Government Girls' High School is a secondary school for girls, located in Natore Sadar Upazila of Natore District. It was established in 1944. After nationalization the school represent his new name Natore Government Girls' High School. Here teachers thought from class 3 to 10.

References

Girls' schools in Bangladesh
Buildings and structures in Rajshahi Division
Educational institutions established in 1944
Schools in Natore District
High schools in Bangladesh
1945 establishments in India